Jean-Louis-Marc Alibert (2 May 1768 – 4 November 1837) was a French dermatologist born in Villefranche-de-Rouergue, Aveyron. He was a pioneer of dermatology.

Life and work 
Originally planning to enter the priesthood, Alibert did not begin studying medicine until he was 26 years old. As a medical student in Paris, he studied with renowned physicians that included Pierre-Joseph Desault (1744–1795), Jean-Nicolas Corvisart (1755-1821), Xavier Bichat (1771–1802) and Philippe Pinel (1745–1826). In 1801 he was appointed  to the Hôpital Saint-Louis (then known as the ), where he administered to patients with skin disorders, syphilis and leprosy. Following the Restoration of the French monarchy, Alibert became a personal physician to Louis XVIII. Later he was a personal physician to Charles X, and was awarded with the title of "baron". Being that there was no chair of dermatology in Paris, Alibert was appointed professor of materia medica and therapeutics in 1823.

Alibert believed that when diagnosing skin disorders several criteria needed to be used, and attempted to introduce a classification system for diseases that was similar to the method Bernard and Antoine Laurent de Jussieu used in botany. Alibert first classified dermatological disorders according to outer appearance, then he divided them into what he called families, genera and species. This system of classification was represented pictorially by Alibert as the "Tree of Dermatoses". Reportedly, from his "tree", Alibert wished to introduce a method rather than a classification system.

Alibert was a prodigious writer, his best known work being the beautifully illustrated . His literary work also included biographies of famed scientists such as Lazzaro Spallanzani (1729-1799) and Luigi Galvani (1737-1798).

In 1806, he was the first to describe a patient with mycosis fungoides. The disease was formerly referred to as "Alibert-Bazin syndrome", named in conjunction with dermatologist Pierre-Antoine-Ernest Bazin (1807-1878). 

In 1818, he was the first to describe a patient with psoriatic arthritis.

See also 
 List of dermatologists

Selected bibliography 
 Dissertation sur les fièvres pernicieuses ou ataxiques intermittentes, Doctoral thesis (1799).

References

External links 
 Jean-Louis-Marc Alibert @ Who Named It, including bibliography of written works.
 French Society for the History of Dermatology "Paris choosing a dermatological hero for the millennium" by Daniel Wallach
 "Baron Jean-Louis ALIBERT 1768 - 1837 Médecin, dermatologue français" Portraites de Medecins

1768 births
1837 deaths
People from Villefranche-de-Rouergue
French dermatologists
Officiers of the Légion d'honneur